Kanam is a panchayat town in Thoothukudi district in the Indian state of Tamil Nadu.

Demographics
 India census, Kanam had a population of 3,134. Males constitute 47.4% of the population and females 52.5%. Kanam has an average literacy rate of  85.05 %, higher than the state average 80.09 %  male literacy is 90.25%, and female literacy is 80.40 %. In Kanam, 9.29% of the population is under 6 years of age.

Landmark

One of the most important place here is the Kanam sluice(மடை), where the local people around the village enjoy fishing, bathing, washing. 

One of the famous temple, Parvathi amman temple of Vallivilai village which administratively comes under Kanam town.

References

Cities and towns in Thoothukudi district